Green for Danger is a popular 1944 detective novel by British writer Christianna Brand, praised for its clever plot, interesting characters, and wartime hospital setting.  It was made into a 1946 film which is regarded by film historians as one of the greatest screen adaptations of a Golden Age mystery novel. (The 2016 BBC Father Brown episode 'The Rod of Asclepius' is also effectively an adaptation of the novel).

Plot summary
A murder takes place in a rural British hospital.  Inspector Cockrill is tasked to determine whodunit when the head nurse is killed after revealing that the death of a patient under anaesthesia was no accident. Cockrill states at one point, "My presence lay over the hospital like a pall - I found it all tremendously enjoyable." After another murder attempt leaves a nurse dangerously ill he re-stages the operation in order to unmask the murderer.

1944 British novels
British mystery novels
British novels adapted into films
Novels set during World War II
Medical novels
Novels set in hospitals
Novels by Christianna Brand
Novels set in England
British detective novels
The Bodley Head books